Sporting Clube de Bustelo (abbreviated as SC Bustelo) is a Portuguese football club based in São Roque, Oliveira de Azeméis in the district of Aveiro.

Background
SC Bustelo currently plays in the Terceira Divisão Série C which is the fourth tier of Portuguese football. The club was founded in 1922 and they play their home matches at the Quinta do Côvo in São Roque, Oliveira de Azeméis. The stadium is able to accommodate 6,000 spectators.

The club is affiliated to Associação de Futebol de Aveiro and has competed in the AF Aveiro Taça. The club has also entered the national cup competition known as Taça de Portugal on a few occasions.

Season to season

Honours
AF Aveiro 1ª Divisão: 	1976/77, 2014/15
AF Aveiro 2ª Divisão: 	1966/67, 2007/08
AF Aveiro Taça: 	2006/07, 2008/09
AF Aveiro Supertaça:  2008/09

Footnotes

External links
Official website 

Football clubs in Portugal
Association football clubs established in 1922
1922 establishments in Portugal